Britton Hill is the highest natural point in the state of Florida, United States, with a summit elevation of  above mean sea level. Britton Hill is the lowest state highpoint in the United States,  lower than the next lowest highpoint, Ebright Azimuth in Delaware, and far lower than many skyscrapers in Miami and other urban areas of Florida.

It is inside Lakewood Park, which marks the high point and features a monument, trails, and an information board.

See also
 
 
 
 List of Florida's highest points
 List of U.S. states by elevation

References

External links
 
 

Hills of Florida
Landforms of Walton County, Florida
Parks in Walton County, Florida
Highest points of U.S. states